Jinze is a town in Qingpu District of Shanghai, China. The town is bordered by two provinces, namely Zhejiang and Jiangsu. With convenient land and water transportation, it is an important transport hub linking Shanghai, Zhejiang and Jiangsu. It is surrounded by the towns of Shenta, Zhouzhuang and Jinxi on the northwest, Liantang Town on the southeast, Zhujiajiao Town on the east, and the towns of Dingshan and Dashun on the southwest.

Name
Jinze, formerly known as "Bainingli". According to Chorography of Jiangnan, the name derives from a farmer got a stone of the same colour as gold.

History
In 978, it used to be in the territory of Northern Song Empire (960–1127) under the jurisdiction of Huating County.

In 1279, the Yuan Empire (1271–1368) set up province system to maintain control of the vast region. Jinze under the jurisdiction of Songjiang Prefecture of Zhejiang Province.

In 1573, in the ruling of Wanli Emperor (1573–1620) of the Ming dynasty (1368–1644), Qingpu County was established. Jinze belonged to Qingpu County.

In 1743, in the reign of Qianlong Emperor (1736–1795) of the Qing dynasty (1644–1911), four townships was founded, namely Haizhong Township, Haishang Township, Huazhong Township and Huashang Township, Jinze came under the jurisdiction of Huashang Township. In 1909, the Qingpu County was divided into 16 autonomous districts, Jinze was one of them.

In 1912, after the establishment of the Republic of China, Jinze became a township. In 1929, the whole county was divided into 13 districts, Jinze was the Fifth District. In 1934, after the merger of districts, it belonged to the Fourth District. In February 1948, after the adjustment of administrative divisions, Jinze became a township.

In July 1949, Qingpu County was divided into 8 districts, Jinze was one of them. In May 1957, Jinze Township was founded. In September 1958, it was renamed "Jinze People's Commune". In May 1986, it was upgraded to a town. In March 2004, the towns of Shangta and Xicen were merged into the town.

Administrative division

As of 2017, the town is divided into 5 communities and 30 villages: 
 Jinxi Community
 Jinyang Community
 Xicen Community
 Liansheng Community
 Shangta Community
 Xuli
 Xinchi
 Jinze
 Yangwan
 Dongxi
 Jianguo
 Jinyao
 Xingang
 Cenbo
 Xicen
 Santang
 Yutian
 Hezhu
 Aiguo
 Dongtian
 Rentun
 Tianshanzhuang
 Gongdu
 Qiansheng
 Dianhu
 Lianhu
 Caibang
 Dongxing
 Wanggang
 Shuangxiang
 Nanxin
 Chendong
 Xuemi
 Dianxi
 Shagang

Geography
The Dianshan Lake is located in the town, it is the largest freshwater lake in Shanghai.

Jinze is in the subtropical oceanic monsoon climate zone and exhibits four distinct seasons.

Economy
The local economy is primarily based upon aquaculture and local industry. The main aquatic products are crabs, turtles, eels, shrimps and various freshwater fish.

Culture
The Farmland and Mountain Folk Song is a national-level intangible cultural heritage.

Tourist attractions
According to historical records, there had been "Six temples, a tower, thirteen archways and forty-two bridges" in the town, among which 21 old bridges survived till today. It is the only town that has so many old bridges in Shanghai, thus earning itself the accolade "the top Bridge Town of Jiangnan region". The five bridges spanning parallel over the  river course in the vicinity of Xiatang Street in particular, were built respectively in the Song, Yuan, Ming and Qing dynasties (960–1911), so there was a saying "Bridges of four dynasties are stringed by one river". Of the five, Puji Bridge and Wan'an Bridge, built in the Southern Song dynasty (1127–1279), are the oldest stone arch bridges in Shanghai. The two being collectively known as the "Sister Bridges".

Religion
Yihao Temple is a Buddhist temple in the town. It was originally built in 1260, during the southern Song dynasty (1127–1279) and renovated under the following dynasties. The temple reached unprecedented fame during the Yuan dynasty (1721–1368), in this respect overtaking Lingyin Temple and Chengtian Temple.

Transportation
The town is connected to two highways: National Highway G318 and G50 Shanghai–Chongqing Expressway.

The main channel is the Taipu River.

Notable people
 Wang Dajue, writer.
 K. K. Chen, Chinese-American pharmacologist.
 Jiang Linhua, sailing competitor.

References

Bibliography
 
 
 

Towns in Shanghai
Divisions of Qingpu District